XESTRC-AM is a Mexican public radio station owned by the government of the state of Campeche. It broadcasts on 920 AM.

It was founded in 1986 as XETEB-AM, a partnership station with the Instituto Mexicano de la Radio. IMER shed the station in 2005.

A discontinuous permit history required a new concession to be issued for XETEB in 2016, at which time the callsign was changed to XESTRC-AM.

External links

References

Public radio in Mexico
Radio stations in Campeche